Carpe Diem is a range of energy and 'functional' soft beverages distributed in the United Kingdom and other European countries by Rauch. They were launched by the founder of Red Bull into an upscale and health conscious drinks marketplace, being first stocked by stores such as Selfridges before being distributed to mainstream stores such as Tesco. These drinks are no longer available in Ireland or the UK.

Range
Carpe Diem features the following flavours:
 Kombucha 
 Vitalising Botanic Water

References

External links
 Bevnet review
 Carpe Diem

Energy drinks
Red Bull